was a Japanese writer.

Life 
After finishing his studies, he worked in a bank and started writing articles for several publications. In 1924, he moved to Tokyo, where he started to publish for the socialist journal Bungei Sensen (文芸戦線) founded by Yōbun Kaneko. Thanks to his 1928 publication Mienai Kōzan (見えない鉱山) in this journal, his works were considered part of the Proletarian literature movement.

Works (sel.) 
 1930 Bōdō
 1930 Kyōkō
 1937 Fukurō
 1938 Uguisu
 1938 Karasu
 1939 Ushi
 1939 Kuma
 1939 Uma
 1939 Sakka no techō
 1939 Tsubame
 1939 Gan
 1939 Ishikawa Rikinosuke nōson kōsei no jufu
 1940 Asaichi
 1941 Tokai to inaka
 1941 Furusato no haru
 1942 Hirata Atsutane
 1942 Isha no iru son
 1942 Kamo to funa
 1942 Roji no hitobito
 1943 Haru no wakare
 1944 Akita
 1946 Utsukushii tabi
 1947 Futatsu no seishun
 1947 Furusato no uta
 1947 Umi no oni
 1948 Yama no kami
 1948 Nōmin no kōfuku
 1952 Keisatsu nikki
 1953 Bungaku nyūmon
 1954 Natuskashii sanka
 1955 Keimusho shigan
 1955 Shinkeisatsu nikki
 1955 Tanima no kyōdai 谷間の兄弟
 1956 Yamazakura
 1957 Chūzaisho nikki
 1957 Nambei kōro
 1959 Shizen to jinsei ni tsuite no shijū hanashi
 1959 Kieru mizuumi
 1959 Santarō
 1960 Shochō nikki

Movies 
 1951 Keisatsu nikki

References

External links 
 www.aozora.gr.jp Aozora
 IMDB

1903 births
1959 deaths
Japanese writers
Proletarian literature
Writers from Akita Prefecture